Interstate 84 (I-84) in Pennsylvania is the westernmost segment of the eastern I-84. Within Pennsylvania, it runs from I-81 in Dunmore east to the New York border near Matamoras.

Route description

I-84 starts in Pennsylvania at I-81 in Dunmore, a suburb east of Scranton, along with the northern end of I-380. After , I-84 splits from I-380, as the latter goes southeasterly through the Poconos and I-84 continues almost due east into Wayne and Pike counties.

This section of Pennsylvania is very lightly populated, and there are no major settlements on or near I-84, although it offers access to popular outdoor recreation areas such as Lake Wallenpaupack and Promised Land State Park. Its right-of-way is very wide, with a large median strip between the two carriageways as it passes through densely wooded country, except for the swampy areas in southern Wayne County. The only development along Pennsylvania's section of I-84 is where U.S. Route 6 (US 6) and US 209 start to parallel closely and form a commercial strip just south of Matamoras, just west of the Delaware River.

On October 15, 2011, the roadway was designated as the Fallen Trooper Memorial Highway throughout its length.

History

I-84 was originally planned to run concurrently with US 6, but, in June 1958, due to a realignment of I-80, I-84 was redesignated as an Interstate. The plan was first revealed to the public in 1964. The first segment to be completed and open to traffic was the bridge spanning the Delaware River between Pennsylvania and New York. The second section from exit 26 to exit 53 opened in 1972.

I-84 was to continue west of I-380 and connect to I-81 at Moosic, but the alignment was moved further north, running concurrently with I-380 from Elmhurst Township to Dunmore. I-380 both ran east from I-81, sharing mileposts and exit numbers, with their split being an unnumbered exit 3 (in accordance with Pennsylvania Department of Transportation (PennDOT) policy at the time which did not allow interchanges between Interstates to be numbered). During the 2001 exit renumbering, I-380 became a north–south Interstate and its mileposts and exit numbers were reversed. Locally, the  overlapping section is commonly spoken as "380, 84". When the exits were renumbered, the exit tabs with button-copy letters for the old exit 4 were moved to the new exit 4 in the eastbound direction and remained in place until the signs were updated.

Exit list

See also

References

External links

 Pennsylvania Highways: Interstate 84
 Pennsylvania Roads - I-84

Pennsylvania
84
Transportation in Lackawanna County, Pennsylvania
Transportation in Wayne County, Pennsylvania
Transportation in Pike County, Pennsylvania